Koračice is a settlement in the Slovene Hills northwest of Ormož in northeastern Slovenia. It belongs to the Municipality of Sveti Tomaž, which became an independent municipality in 2006. The area traditionally belonged to the Styria region and is now included in the Drava Statistical Region.

The small village chapel-shrine with a belfry was built in 1919 and 1920.

References

External links
Koračice on Geopedia

Populated places in the Municipality of Sveti Tomaž